Harry Dominic Chiti Jr. (pronounced  ) (November 16, 1932 – January 31, 2002) was an American catcher in Major League Baseball. Born in Kincaid, Illinois, he was the father of major league coach Dom Chiti.

Career
A competent defensive catcher with a great ability to handle the knuckleball, Chiti was 17 years old when he broke into the majors with the Chicago Cubs in September 1950, and he made infrequent appearances in MLB from 1950 to 1952 as he learned his trade in the Cubs' farm system.

After two years in the United States Army during the Korean War, Chiti returned to Chicago and handled the starting job in 1955, batting .231 with 11 home runs and 41 RBI in a career-high 113 games.

In 1956, Chiti shared catching duties with Hobie Landrith. On May 30 (Memorial Day) he made an entry for himself in Cubs trivia, during the second game of a windblown doubleheader against the Milwaukee Braves, in which 39 runs were scored overall. While being intentionally walked, Chiti hit Ray Crone's pitch, delivered a little too close to the outside corner of the plate, into the right field corner for a triple.

At season's end, he was sent to the 1956 World Series champion New York Yankees but never saw any action with the Bronx Bombers. He was drafted by the Kansas City Athletics from New York in the 1957 Rule 5 draft. 

Chiti played with the Athletics from 1958 to 1960. The next three years, he was part of transactions between the A's, Detroit Tigers, Baltimore Orioles and Cleveland Indians.

On April 25, 1962—before he played a game for the Indians—Chiti was acquired by the expansion New York Mets for a player to be named later. However, he was sent back to the Indians on June 15, 1962, after 15 games and a .195 batting average. Chiti was the "player to be named later"; he became the first MLB player to be traded for himself. Three other players have been traded for themselves: Dickie Noles, Brad Gulden, and John McDonald. Chiti never played another major league game, spending two more years at Triple-A before retiring in 1964.

Harry Chiti died on January 31, 2002, at Heart of Florida Hospital in Haines City, at the age of 69. He was survived by his wife Catherine; his daughter Cindy; his son Dom; and eight grandchildren. He is buried at Rolling Hills Cemetery in Winter Haven, Florida.

References

External links

Harry Chiti - Baseballbiography.com
Encyclopedia of Baseball Catchers
Rule V Draft
Ultimate Mets Database

1932 births
2002 deaths
United States Army personnel of the Korean War
Baseball players from Illinois
Cangrejeros de Santurce (baseball) players
Chicago Cubs players
Denver Bears players
Des Moines Bruins players
Detroit Tigers players
Indios de Oriente players
Jacksonville Suns players
Kansas City Athletics players
Liga de Béisbol Profesional Roberto Clemente catchers
Major League Baseball catchers
New York Mets players
People from Christian County, Illinois
Richmond Virginians (minor league) players
Rochester Red Wings players
Springfield Cubs players
Toronto Maple Leafs (International League) players